Hameed Pur Kalan is a village in Kamoki, Gujranwala.

Villages in Gujranwala District